Ingotia is a genus of soft corals in the family Xeniidae.

Species
The World Register of Marine Species lists the following species:

Ingotia bakusi Alderslade, 2001
Ingotia scintillans (Thomson & Mackinnon, 1910)
Ingotia sprungi Alderslade, 2001

References

Xeniidae
Octocorallia genera